Opdal may refer to:

Opdal, an old name for Uvdal municipality, Buskerud, Norway
Opdal, an old name for Oppdal municipality, Sør-Trøndelag, Norway
Håkon Opdal, Norwegian football goalkeeper